The 2007 Wealden District Council election took place on 3 May 2007 to elect members of Wealden District Council in East Sussex, England. The whole council was up for election and the Conservative Party stayed in overall control of the council.

Background
At the 2003 election the Conservatives held control of the council with 34 seats, compared to 15 for the Liberal Democrats and 6 independents. However, in September 2006 Liberal Democrat councillor Stephen Shing was expelled from the Liberal Democrats and continued on the council as an independent.

The Conservatives took 4 seats without any opposition and were also guaranteed seats in other wards where there were not enough candidates from other parties for the number of seats being contested. The returning officer for Wealden, Charlie Lant, formed a band called The Council Tax Band with other council officers and performed a song called Vote! in an effort to boost turnout at the election.

An important issue at the election was a legal loophole, which was allowing developers to build increased numbers of houses in the area.

Election result
The Conservatives held control of the council staying on 34 seats, but both the Conservative leader of the council Nigel Coltman and the Liberal Democrat group leader Laura Murphy were defeated. The Liberal Democrats lost 2 seats, dropping to 12 councillors, while independents remained on 7 seats and the Green party won its first councillors on the council after gaining 2 seats. Overall turnout at the election was 38.51%, up from 35% in 2003.

The Conservative leader Nigel Coltman was defeated by Liberal Democrat Brian Cook in Hailsham East by a 55-vote majority, with the Conservatives also losing 2 seats to the Greens in Forest Row. However the Conservatives did not suffer a net loss of seats as they also made gains including defeating the Liberal Democrat group leader Laura Murphy in Hailsham Central and North. The Liberal Democrats did gain a seat in Polegate South from an independent by 1 vote, but Stephen Shing was re-elected as an independent in Willingdon, while Shing's son Daniel also gained a seat in the same ward and Shing's wife Oi Lin gained one in Polegate North.

Ward results

By-elections between 2007 and 2011

Uckfield New Town
A by-election was held in Uckfield New Town on 17 July 2008 after Liberal Democrat councillor Julia Hey resigned from the council.

Alfriston
A by-election was held in Alfriston on 25 September 2008 after Conservative Keith Whitehead stood down from the council. The seat was gained from the Conservatives by Liberal Democrat Andy Watkins with a 30-vote majority, defeating the former Conservative leader of Wealden council, Nigel Coltman who had been trying to return to the council.

Heathfield North and Central
A by-election was held in Heathfield North and Central on 23 September 2010 after the death of Conservative councillor Niki Oakes in June 2010.

References

2007 English local elections
2007
2000s in East Sussex